The Batillus blind snake (Anilios batillus) is a species of snake in the Typhlopidae family.

References

Anilios
Reptiles described in 1894
Snakes of Australia